Cristina Cosentino (born 22 December 2000) is an Argentinian field hockey goalkeeper.

Hockey career 
She was the part of the Argentine team that won the 2016 Women's Hockey Junior World Cup after a beating the Netherlands in the finals.

In 2019, Cosentino was called into the senior national women's team. She competed in the team that finished fourth at the 2019 Pro League in Amstelveen.

References

1997 births
Living people
Las Leonas players
Argentine female field hockey players
Female field hockey goalkeepers
Field hockey players from Buenos Aires
21st-century Argentine women